The UAE Pro League, known for sponsorship reasons as the ADNOC Pro League, is the top professional football league in the United Arab Emirates (UAE). The first team to win the title was Al Orouba (Sharjah), whilst Al Ain has the record with 14 league titles to their name. Fourteen clubs compete in the League that operates on a system of promotion and relegation with the First Division League.

The League was founded in 1973 as the UAE Football League. The first 1973–74 season was a "trial" championship but was declared official by the UAE FA in 2001. In February 2007, the Pro League Committee was formed, and became the organising body of the League.

Name change
Starting from the 2006–07 season the name was changed from UAE League to Etisalat League. And since the 2013–14 season, the name was changed from Etisalat Pro League to Arabian Gulf League, which was named after the Arabian Gulf as per the chairman of Pro League Committee. However, the name change has been viewed as a revival of the Persian Gulf naming dispute with Iran accusing the United Arab Emirates of bigotry, and the Iranian Football Federation barring the transfer of Javad Nekounam to a UAE club. After about four months of the name change a 70 million AED one-year renewable partnership deal was announced with Arabian Gulf Development to be named Official Title Partner. On the 8th of August, the Pro League signed a new partnership deal with ADNOC worth 80 million AED, from the start of the 2021–22 season, the league was renamed to the UAE's ADNOC Pro League.

Ranking

Ranking
As of 28 May 2021

Clubs

Member clubs (2022–23)
Note: Table lists clubs in alphabetical order.

Prior to UAE League's transition to the professional era in 2008, many clubs have competed in the country's top tier division from 1973–74 to 2007–08. The below list is clubs that have competed in the UAE top tier league since the Pro League era starting in 2008–09.

Seasons in Pro League

 14 seasons: Al Ain, Al Jazira, Al Nasr, Al Wahda, Al Wasl
 13 seasons: Al Dhafra, Sharjah
 12 seasons: Baniyas
 11 seasons: Ajman 
 9 seasons: Emirates, Al Ahli, Al Shabab
 8 seasons: Kalba
 6 seasons: Dibba Al Fujairah
 5 seasons: Shabab Al Ahli
 4 seasons: Al Shaab, Dubai, Fujairah, Khor Fakkan
 3 seasons: Hatta
 1 season: Al Bataeh, Al Urooba

Notes:
 Italtics indicates that the club no longer exists
 Bold indicates that the club is still competing in the UAE Pro League as of 2022–23

Managers

List of champions
Source:

Notes
1. Competition cancelled due to Gulf war
2. Competition cancelled due to COVID-19 pandemic in the United Arab Emirates

Champions

Performance by club

Notes
1. Al Shabab along with Dubai CSC merged into Al-Ahli form Shabab Al Ahli in 2017
2. Al Shaab dissolved in 2017

Performance by city

Performance by emirates

As of July 2016 following clubs are officially allowed to wear stars while playing in the League, Each country's usage is unique and in UAE the practice is to award one star for each five titles won. The number in parentheses is for League titles won.

  Al Ain (13)
 Shabab Al Ahli (7)
 Al Wasl (7)
 Sharjah (6)

Players

All-time top scorers
Source:

Top scorers by season

By country

References

External links
Official website 

 
United Arab Emirates
1973 establishments in the United Arab Emirates
Sports leagues established in 1973
Football leagues in the United Arab Emirates